Erno Crisa (10 March 1914 – 4 April 1968) was an Italian film actor. He appeared in more than 50 films between 1944 and 1968. His last film was the spaghetti western Sugar Colt.

Partial filmography

 Croisières sidérales (1942) - L'homme sur le manège (uncredited)
 Coup de tête (1944) - (uncredited)
 St. Val's Mystery (1945) - Dédé - le vagabond
 The Last Judgment (1945)
 Christine se marie (1946)
 Les gueux au paradis (1946)
 La figure de proue (1948) - Le Guen
 Scandale (1948)
 The White Line (1950) - Stefano
 The Last Sentence (1951) - Roberto
 Messalina (1951) - Timo / Timus
 Sunday Heroes (1952) - Stefan
 Papà ti ricordo (1952)
 La colpa di una madre (1952) - Alberto
 Canzoni di mezzo secolo (1952)
 I falsari (1953) - Pietro
 Jealousy (1953) - Baron Antonio
 Cavalcade of Song (1953) - Il guappo
 Violenza sul lago (1954) - Marco
 Mata Hari's Daughter (1954) - Prince Anak
 Cañas y barro (1954) - Jaime
 The Gold of Naples (1954) - Don Nicola (segment "Teresa")
 Questi fantasmi (1954)
 Di qua, di là del Piave (1954)
 La Tierra del Fuego se apaga (1955)
 Lady Chatterley's Lover (1955) - Oliver Mellors
 Don Juan (1956) - Don Juan
 La fille de feu (1958) - Larry Gordon
 Caterina Sforza, la leonessa di Romagna (1959) - Cesare Borgia
 The Black Archer (1959) - Lodovico
 Due selvaggi a corte (1959) - Marco Venier
 I mafiosi (1959) - Turi
 Carthage in Flames (1960) - Asdrubak
 The Cossacks (1960) - Kasi
 Purple Noon (1960) - Inspector Ricordi
 Cleopatra's Daughter (1960) - Kefren - Tegi's Councellor
 The Bacchantes (1961) - Atteon
 Maciste contro lo sceicco (1962) - The Sheik
 Julius Caesar Against the Pirates (1962) - Silla
 Passport for a Corpse (1962) - Walter
 Taras Bulba, the Cossack (1962)
 Colossus of the Arena (1962) - Oniris
 Le due leggi (1962)
 Goliath and the Sins of Babylon (1963) - Morakeb
 Brennus, Enemy of Rome (1963) - Decio Vatinio
 Le fils de Tarass Boulba (1964)
 Vengeance of the Vikings (1965) - Eyolf
 Seven Rebel Gladiators (1965) - Morakeb
 Kommissar X – Drei gelbe Katzen (1966) - Baker
 Sugar Colt (1966) - Yonker
 Pecos Cleans Up (1967)
 Angelique and the Sultan (1968) - Turkish Ambassador

References

External links

1914 births
1968 deaths
Italian male film actors
20th-century Italian male actors